Four Moons is a 2014 Mexican drama directed by Sergio Tovar Velarde.
It stars Antonio Velázquez, Alejandro de la Madrid, César Ramos, Gustavo Egelhaaf, Alonso Echánove, Alejandro Belmonte, Karina Gidi and Juan Manuel Bernal. It was one of fourteen films shortlisted by Mexico to be their submission for the Academy Award for Best Foreign Language Film at the 88th Academy Awards, but it lost out to 600 Miles. Alonso Echánove was nominated for an Ariel Award for Best Supporting Actor in 2015 for his role in Cuatro Lunas.

Plot
Four interwoven and complex stories of love and acceptance (of self and others): a boy who has secretly been attracted to his male cousin through life; two college students starting a secret relationship; a committed couple severely tested by the arrival of another man; and an old married man dazzled by a young married male who hustles to get back to his own family.

Cast 
 Antonio Velázquez as Hugo
 Alejandro de la Madrid as Andrés
 César Ramos as Fito
 Gustavo Egelhaaf as Leo
 Alonso Echánove as Joaquín
  as Gilberto
   as Laura
 Gabriel Santoyo   as Mauricio
 Sebastián Rivera  as Oliver
 Juan Manuel Bernal as Héctor
 Marta Aura as Petra
 Mónica Dionne as Aurora
 Astrid Hadad as Alfonsina
 Hugo Catalán  as Sebastián
 Jorge Luis Moreno as Enrique
 Luis Arrieta as Alfredo
 Laura de Ita  as Amanda
 Joaquín Rodríguez  as Bruno
 Marisol Centeno as Mariana
 Alejandra Ley as Tania
 Héctor Arredondo as the priest
  as Rolando
 Renato Bartilotti as Doctor
 Oscar Olivares as Alejandro
 Martín Barba as Pepe

References

External links 

 
 
 

LGBT-related romantic drama films
Mexican LGBT-related films
2014 films
Gay-related films
2014 LGBT-related films
Mexican romantic drama films
2010s romance films
2010s Spanish-language films
2010s Mexican films